Ik Kil is a cenote outside Pisté in the Tinúm Municipality, Yucatán, Mexico. It is located in the northern center of the Yucatán Peninsula and is part of the Ik Kil Archeological Park near Chichen Itza.  It is open to the public for swimming.

Description

There is a carved stairway that leads down to a swimming platform.

Cenote Ik Kil is near the Mayan ruins of Chichen Itza, on the highway to Valladolid. Ik Kil was considered sacred by the Mayans who used the site as a location for human sacrifice to their rain god, Chaac. Bones and pieces of jewelry were found in the deep waters of this cenote by archaeologists and speleologists.

The cenote is part of a complex that includes a restaurant and hotel. Ik Kil was a location on the Red Bull Cliff Diving World Series in 2010, 2011 and 2014.

See also 
 List of sinkholes of Mexico

References

External links 

National Geographic
Lonely Planet 

Natural history of Yucatán
Sinkholes of Mexico
Museums in Yucatán